Heuchera elegans is a species of flowering plant in the saxifrage family known by the common name urn-flowered alumroot.

It is endemic to the San Gabriel Mountains of Southern California, where it grows on the rocky slopes.

Heuchera elegans is a rhizomatous perennial herb with multi-lobed leaves. It produces an erect, drooping inflorescence which bears bright pink or magenta bell-shaped flowers.

Cultivation
While uncommon in the wild, Heuchera elegans is cultivated as an ornamental plant for its attractive garden flower, and for wildlife gardens and  natural landscaping.

External links

 Calflora Database: Heuchera caespitosa (Urn-flowered alumroot) — formerly Heuchera elegans.
Jepson Manual eFlora (TJM2) treatment of Heuchera caespitosa — formerly Heuchera elegans.
UC Photos gallery — Heuchera caespitosa

elegans
Endemic flora of California
~
Natural history of the Transverse Ranges
Natural history of Los Angeles County, California
~
Garden plants of North America
Bird food plants
Flora without expected TNC conservation status